Hurtle Square, also known as Tangkaira, is one of five public squares in the Adelaide city centre, South Australia. Located in the centre of the south-eastern quarter of the city, it surrounds the intersection of Halifax and Pulteney Streets. Its north edge is bounded by Carrington Street. 

It is one of six squares designed by the founder of Adelaide, Colonel William Light, who was Surveyor-General at the time, in his 1837 plan of the City of Adelaide which spanned the River Torrens Valley, comprising the city centre (South Adelaide) and North Adelaide. The square was named in 1837 by the Street Naming Committee after James Hurtle Fisher, South Australia's first Resident Commissioner. In 2003, as part of the dual naming initiative by the Adelaide City Council, a second name, Tangkaira, was assigned in the Kaurna language of the original inhabitants.

History
The street naming committee named the square after James Hurtle Fisher, South Australia's first Resident Commissioner, on 23 May 1837.

In March 2003, as part of the City of Adelaide's dual naming project, in association with the University of Adelaide's Kaurna Dictionary Project, the square was assigned the name "Tangkaira", a word which means "fungus", after a prominent Kaurna person. Tangkaira (also known as Charlotte), who came from the Clare district, was the wife of Ityamai-itpina (aka "King Rodney"), a key negotiator with the new colonists. She provided what would become an important resource for reviving the Kaurna language in recent times, by writing one of the earliest examples of the written Kaurna language: a letter by school children to Governor Gawler in 1841, pleading that he continue working as Governor.

Description
Located in the centre of the south-eastern quarter of the city, the Square surrounds the intersection of Halifax and Pulteney Streets, with its northern edge is bounded by Carrington Street. The surrounding area is mostly residential.

See also
Hindmarsh Square/Mukata
Light Square/Wauwi
Victoria Square/Tarntanyangga
Iparrityi
William Light

References

Further reading

Squares in Adelaide
Parks in Adelaide